The 2017–18 Fresno State Bulldogs men's basketball team represented California State University, Fresno in the 2017–18 NCAA Division I men's basketball season. The Bulldogs were led by seventh-year head coach Rodney Terry and played their home games at the Save Mart Center as members of the Mountain West Conference. They finished the season 21–11, 11–7 in Mountain West play to finish in a tie for fourth place. They lost in the quarterfinals of the Mountain West Conference tournament to San Diego State. Despite having 21 wins, they did not participate in a postseason tournament.

On March 12, 2018, head coach Rodney Terry left Fresno State to become head coach at UTEP. He finished at Fresno State with a seven-year record of 126–108. On April 5, it was announced that the school had hired San Diego State assistant coach Justin Hutson as head coach.

Previous season

The Bulldogs finished the season 20–13 overall; and 11–7 in the conference. During the season, Fresno State was invited and participated in the Mountain West–Missouri Valley Challenge, where they defeated Drake in Des Moines, Iowa. In the postseason, Fresno State won against New Mexico but lost to Nevada in the semifinals of the 2017 Mountain West Conference men's basketball tournament in Paradise, Nevada. The Bulldogs were invited and participated in the 2017 National Invitation Tournament, where they lost to TCU in the first round in Fort Worth, Texas.

Offseason

Departures

Incoming transfers

2017 recruiting class

2018 recruiting class

Preseason 
In a vote by conference media at the Mountain West media day, the Brulldogs were picked to finish in fourth place in the Mountain West.

Roster

Schedule and results
Source

|-
!colspan=12 style=""| Exhibition

|-
!colspan=12 style=""| Non-conference regular season

|-
!colspan=12 style=""| Mountain West regular season

|-
!colspan=12 style=""|

References

Fresno State Bulldogs men's basketball seasons
Fresno State